The 2012 Copa Catalunya Femenina was the eighth edition of the competition and ran from 26 May to 27 August 2012, with the Final Four taking place in Manresa. FC Barcelona defeated RCD Espanyol on penalties in the final to win its fourth title in a row. UE L'Estartit and CE Sant Gabriel also reached the Final Four.

Results

First round
The matches were played on 26 and 27 May 2012.

|}

Second round
The matches were played on 2 and 3 June 2012.

|}
1 This game was originally won by Badalona (2–7) before it was awarded a default victory in favor of Júpiter.

Third round
The matches were played on 9, 10 and 16 June 2012.

|}

Quarter-finals
The matches were played on 16, 21 and 23 June 2012.

|}

Semifinals

Final

References

2011–12 in Spanish football cups
Cata
Women